Fury of the Demon is a 2016 French/Croatian/United States mockumentary film that was written and directed by Fabien Delage. The movie tells the history of film pioneer and director Georges Méliès by way of a documentary focusing on a fictional lost short film that is reputed to have the capability of driving its viewers insane.

The film had its world premiere in 2016 and its United States premiere on October 15, 2016 at the Brooklyn Horror Film Festival.

Synopsis
The documentary focuses on a fictional short film, La rage du Démon, that is purported to have driven its viewers into a temporary but extremely chaotic and rage-filled frenzy. Because of the violence and destruction caused, the movie has only been shown a handful of times and is believed to have been lost. The only known evidence of the film's existence are newspaper reports of murder, arson, and overall destruction that have occurred at theaters where the film was stated to have been shown.

The director of the short film is ultimately unknown but is believed to have been Georges Méliès, a landmark film pioneer and director. Throughout the documentary film directors. critics, and film historians, as well as his granddaughter Pauline, comment on the legitimacy of the claim by discussing the history and achievements of Méliès and his life's work.

Cast
Alexandre Aja
 Dave Alexander
Jean-Jacques Bernard
Christophe Gans
 Pauline Méliès

Reception
Fury of the Demon was reviewed by outlets such as Screen Anarchy and Bloody Disgusting, the latter of which stated that while some of the content was repetitious, the documentary's interviewees were a "great mix of deadly sincere, enthusiastic, and scholarly" and that it was "a breezy, entertaining watch that cinephiles and horror hounds will particularly dig." Tom Holland's Terror Time and SciFiNow also praised the choice of interviewees for the film, as well as Delage's attention to historical information. Dread Central wrote a favorable review for the film, rating it at 3.5 out of 5 stars and stating that "Not only does Fury of the Demon work as a great made-for-TV documentary with lots of intrigue, it highlights the inherent horror elements of Méliés work and invites the viewer to track down his films and fall down the rabbit hole."

See also
"Cigarette Burns" (2005)

References

External links
 
 

2016 films
2016 horror films
2010s mockumentary films
Cultural depictions of Georges Méliès
Films about curses
Films about films
Films based on urban legends
French horror films
2010s French-language films
2010s English-language films
Hell in popular culture
2016 multilingual films
French multimedia artists
2010s French films